Gramlich is a German surname. Notable people with the surname include:

Arthur Benedict Gramlich (1904–1974), German-American miner and activist
Charles Gramlich (born 1958), American writer
Edward Gramlich (1939–2007), American economist and academic
Hermann Gramlich (1913–1942), German footballer
Jeffrey Gramlich, American academic
Lori Gramlich, American politician
Rudolf Gramlich (1908–1988), German footballer and chairman

German-language surnames